Legend of the Lost Tomb is a 1997 American adventure thriller film directed by Jonathan Winfrey and written by Jeremy Doner, based on the 1983 young adult book Tales of a Dead King by Walter Dean Myers. It premiered on Showtime on May 18, 1997.

Plot
Fifteen-year-old John Robie's father is an Egyptologist who goes missing during an excavation in Egypt. After arriving in Egypt to search for his missing father, he meets seventeen-year-old Karen Lacy. The two team up to find clues to John's missing father and to his excavations which included a map to the treasures of the Pharaoh Ramesses II.

While they are on their search, they are pursued by mysterious men who are in search of the map as well.

Cast
Stacy Keach as Dr. William Bent
Brock Pierce as John Robie
Kimberlee Peterson as Karen Lacy
Rick Rossovich as Dr. Eric Leonhardt
Khaled El-Sawi as Salaam
Hamdy Heykal as Scorpion
Youssef Dawood as Dr. Gamael
Tarek Eletreby	as Ali
Mahmoud El Lozy as Hotel Manager
Zahi Hawass as Director of the Pyramids
Pierre Sioufi as Sunshine Tour Guide
Abdel Lateef Gamaea as Jeep Driver
Mohamed Baeter as Fruit Vendor
Hani Desokey as Dig Director
Jonathan Winfrey as Tourist
Farouk Abaziad	as Omar
Foad Abbass as Conductor
Magdi Ismael as Engineer
Noha Farouk as Secretary
Mohamed El Betar as Bazaar Vendor
Hassan El Doukshi as Ramses II

References

External links

Legend of the Lost Tomb on Showtime's website
Legend of the Lost Tomb on TV Guide

1997 films
1997 thriller films
1990s adventure thriller films
1990s American films
1990s English-language films
1990s teen films
Adventure television films
American adventure thriller films
American thriller television films
Films based on American novels
Films based on young adult literature
Films directed by Jonathan Winfrey
Films produced by Julie Corman
Films scored by Kevin Kiner
Films set in Egypt
Showtime (TV network) films
Teen adventure films
Teen thriller films
Television films based on books
Treasure hunt films